Spanish destroyer Almirante Ferrandiz may refer to:

 , was a  launched in 1928

Spanish Navy ship names